Bronwood is a town in Terrell County, Georgia, United States. As of the 2020 census, the city had a population of 334.

It is part of the Albany, Georgia Metropolitan Statistical Area.

History
Bronwood was originally called "Brown's Station" in 1858, when the railroad was extended to that point, after one Mr. Brown, a railroad official. The Georgia General Assembly incorporated the place in 1883 as "Bronwood", with the town's limits extended in a one mile radius from the depot at Brown's station.

Geography
Bronwood is located at  (31.830959, -84.363942).

The closest cities are Dawson (six miles away), Americus 21 miles and Albany 25 miles.

Demographics

As of the census of 2000, there were 513 people, 186 households, and 124 families residing in the town. The racial makeup of the town was 33.53% White, 65.69% African American, 0.39% Native American, and 0.39% from two or more races. Hispanic or Latino of any race were 1.17% of the population.

There were 186 households, out of which 36.6% had children under the age of 18 living with them, 38.7% were married couples living together, 23.1% had a female householder with no husband present, and 32.8% were non-families. 31.2% of all households were made up of individuals, and 15.6% had someone living alone who was 65 years of age or older.  The average household size was 2.67 and the average family size was 3.35.

In the town, the population was spread out, with 33.1% under the age of 18, 8.2% from 18 to 24, 25.0% from 25 to 44, 18.3% from 45 to 64, and 15.4% who were 65 years of age or older.  The median age was 34 years. For every 100 females, there were 83.2 males.  For every 100 females age 18 and over, there were 70.6 males.

The median income for a household in the town was $20,250, and the median income for a family was $28,750. Males had a median income of $25,446 versus $16,719 for females. The per capita income for the town was $12,140.  About 26.3% of families and 25.4% of the population were below the poverty line, including 29.2% of those under age 18 and 38.2% of those age 65 or over.

References

Towns in Terrell County, Georgia
Towns in Georgia (U.S. state)
Albany metropolitan area, Georgia